The Apperson Six Sport Sedan was a car manufactured by the Apperson Company of Kokomo, Indiana.

Apperson Six Sport Sedan specifications (1926 data) 
 Color – Imperial blue, maroon, and gray-green
 Seating Capacity – Five
 Wheelbase – 120 inches
 Wheels - Disc
 Tires - 32” x 5.77” balloon
 Service Brakes – Mechanical four wheel brakes
 Engine  - Six cylinder, vertical, cast en block, 3-3/16 x 4-1/4 inches; head removable; valves in head; H.P. 24.4 N.A.C.C. rating
 Lubrication – Force feed
 Crankshaft - Four bearing
 Radiator – Tubular
 Cooling – Thermo-syphon
 Ignition system – Storage Battery
 Starting System – Two Unit
 Voltage – Six to eight
 Wiring System – Single
 Gasoline System – Vacuum
 Clutch – Disc
 Transmission – Selective sliding
 Gear Changes – 3 forward, 1 reverse, mechanically operated
 Drive – Spiral bevel
 Rear Springs – Three-quarter elliptic
 Rear Axle – Semi-floating
 Steering Gear – Worm and gear

Standard equipment
New car price included the following items:
 tools
 jack
 front bumper
 windshield cleaner
 rearview mirror
 speedometer
 ammeter
 dash fuel gauge
 rim
 foot rest
 armrests 
 heater
 snubbers
 ventilators on all doors
 screened cowl ventilator
 sun visor
 Sport Phaetons have permanent top and windshield wings
 All sizes equipped with preselecting mechanical gear shift

Optional equipment
The following was available at an extra cost:
 none

Prices
New car prices were F.O.B. factory, plus Tax:
 Five passenger Phaeton - $1650
 Five passenger Sport Phaeton - $1750
 Five passenger Sport Sedan - $2250
 Five passenger Brougham - $2150
 Four passenger Coupé - $2250

References
Source: 

Cars of the United States
Vintage vehicles